Scamander  or  Skamandros (Ancient Greek: Σκάμανδρος) was a king in Boeotia.

Etymology 
The meaning of the name is "left(-handed) man". The second element looks like it is derived from Greek  (andrós) meaning "of a man", but there are sources who doubt this. The first element is more difficult to pinpoint: it could be derived from Greek  (skazo) "to limp, to stumble (over an obstacle)" or from Greek  (skaios) meaning "left(-handed)" or "awkward". The meaning of the name might then perhaps be "limping man" or "awkward man".

Mythology 
Scamander named the Inachus river after himself; the stream nearby he called Glaucia from his mother, and the spring Acidusa he named after his wife. His father was Deimachus, son of Eleon. Scamander and Acidusa are the parents of the maidens, who were honoured in Boeotia.

Notes 

Ancient Boeotians
Kings in Greek mythology

Reference 

 Lucius Mestrius Plutarchus, Moralia with an English Translation by Frank Cole Babbitt. Cambridge, MA. Harvard University Press. London. William Heinemann Ltd. 1936. Online version at the Perseus Digital Library. Greek text available from the same website.